Reine is the administrative centre of Moskenes Municipality in Nordland county, Norway. Reine Church is located here and it serves the northern part of the municipality.

The local newspaper is the Lofotposten.

Overview
Reine has been a trading post since 1743. It was also a centre for the local fishing industry with a fleet of boats and facilities for fish processing and marketing. There was also a little light industry. In December 1941, the Germans burnt part of Reine in reprisal for a raid on the Lofoten Islands by British troops. Today tourism is important, and despite its remote location, many thousands of people visit annually.  The village is situated on a promontory just off the European route E10 highway, which passes through the village. Reine is located immediately to the south of Sakrisoya and Hamnøya.

Allers, the largest weekly magazine in Norway, selected Reine as the most beautiful village in Norway in the late 1970s. A photograph over Reine from the mountain Reinebringen (altitude ) has been used for the front page of several tourist brochures and books. In 1999 the painter Ingo Kühl set up a temporary studio in a rorbu and painted the view over the harbor to the mountain range.
In January 2015, Reine was the site from which Coca-Cola launched Coca-Cola life in Norway, referred to by the company as "our smallest launch yet". More than half the town's residents (around 200 out of 307) attended this open-air event despite being mid-winter.
In 2016–2019, a stone staircase was built up to Reinebringen, which made the mountain (previously considered steep, muddy, and difficult to climb) easily accessible.

Gallery

References

External links

Reine, Moskenes (Nordland) Weather Forecast
Lofotposten

Fishing communities
Moskenes
Populated places of Arctic Norway
Tourist attractions in Nordland
Villages in Nordland